Skarpnäck may refer to:
Skarpnäck borough in Stockholm, Sweden
Skarpnäck metro station, a Stockholm metro station
Skarpnäck parish, a Church of Sweden parish in Stockholm, Sweden
Skarpnäcksfältet, a subdistrict in Skarpnäcks Gård district, Skarpnäck borough
Skarpnäck Airfield, a former airfield